Shepherdia canadensis, commonly called Canada buffaloberry, russet buffaloberry, soopolallie, soapberry, or foamberry (Ktunaxa: ,) is one of a small number of shrubs of the genus Shepherdia that bears edible berries.

Description
The fruit is usually red, but one variety has yellow berries. The berries have a bitter taste.

It is a non-legume nitrogen fixer.

Etymology 
The common name of the plant in British Columbia is "soopolallie", a word derived from the historic Chinook Jargon trading language spoken in the North American Pacific Northwest in the 19th and early 20th centuries. The name is a composite of the Chinook words "soop" (soap) and "olallie" (berry).

Distribution and habitat 
The species is widespread in all of Canada, except in Prince Edward Island, and in the western and northern United States, including Alaska and Idaho.

Uses 

Some Canadian First Nations peoples such as Nlaka'pamux (Thompson), St'at'imc (Lillooet), and Secwepemc (Shuswap) in the Province of British Columbia extensively collect the berries. The bitter berries are not directly consumed but rather processed as "sxusem", also spelled "sxushem" and "xoosum" or "hooshum" ("Indian ice cream"). Collection involves placing a mat or tarpaulin below the bushes, hitting the branches, collecting the very ripe fruits, mixing with other sweet fruit such as raspberries, crushing the mixture, and then beating of the mixture to raise the foam characteristic of the dish. 

The berry is both sweet and bitter, and is possibly comparable to the taste of sweetened coffee. The First Nations peoples who prepare a dish with it believe that the berry has many health properties, but the saponin chemicals it contains (which create a foam when whipped into a dessert dish) may cause gastrointestinal irritation if large quantities are consumed. Native-themed restaurants in British Columbia have occasionally offered the berries on their menus.

Unrelated plants in the genus Sapindus produce toxic saponins and are also commonly denominated "soapberry".

References

External links

United States Department of Agriculture Plants profile for Shepherdia canadensis (russet buffaloberry)
Province of British Columbia Ministry of Forests: Shepherdia canadensis (soopolallie) 

Indigenous cuisine in Canada
Berries
canadensis
Flora of Eastern Canada
Flora of the North-Central United States
Flora of the Northeastern United States
Flora of the South-Central United States
Flora of the Southwestern United States
Flora of Subarctic America
Flora of Western Canada
Plants described in 1753
Flora of the Northwestern United States
Taxa named by Carl Linnaeus
Taxa named by Thomas Nuttall